Sports in Saint Lucia consist of a wide variety of games.

Football 
Saint Lucia has its own national football team.

Cricket
Darren Sammy was the first and only St Lucian to be called up to the West Indies Cricket Team. Darren Sammy was the first St Lucian to play Test cricket in the West Indies and his figures were the second best by a West Indian debutante after Alf Valentine took eight wickets in 1950. St Lucia annually hosts games in the West Indies limited-overs and four-day cricket competitions, usually at the Beausejour Cricket Grounds, one of the most modern facilities in West Indies cricket. Sammy played his first major international match at Beausejour in 2008, a one-day international against Sri Lanka. Nadine George is another of St Lucia's leading cricketers. She was the first West Indies woman to hit a century in Test cricket and was eventually named captain of the West Indies team.

Athletics

St Lucia is also home to Levern Spencer, who is a high jumper and holds the national record of 1.94 meters. She has won Pan American Commonwealth and CAC Games medals. 

Darvin Edwards holds the St Lucian National Record for the men's High Jump with a height of 2.31m. He won a bronze medal at the 2011 Central American and Caribbean Championships in Athletics.

Golf
There are three golf courses in St Lucia. The Sandals St Lucia golf course is equipped with 18 holes and is on the southern part of the island. The St Lucia Golf & Country club has 18 holes and Jalousie Hilton Resort & Spa has nine holes.

Tennis
Tennis is growing in popularity in St Lucia. The St Lucian hotel of the island offers two coobuip Junior Tournament takes place. St Lucia is also an annual competitor in the Davis Cup, an international tennis competition, with former Sportsman of the Year Vernon Lewis and Kane Easter having been two of the island's consistent players over the years. The Government of St Lucia is planning on constructing a Tennis Centre.
(update)  
The Tennis Center has been built and was opened to the public on 11 April 2011. 
Which has fostered the growth of  many young athletes.  
Also on the rise is a tennis Academy,  namely Tigers Inflow tennis Academy,  which is geared at introducing kids to the sport and also opening avenues so that these kids can gain scholarships to university to further education and their tennis careers.

Volleyball
Volleyball enjoyed a period of growth in the 1980s, when club rivalries between teams like Le Club and Ciceron Seagulls fuelled growth in interest. St Lucia won the Organisation of Eastern Caribbean States (OECS) men's and women's volleyball competitions a number of times, including having won the women's tournament when it was held for the first time at the Beausejour Indoor Facility in 2008. The Beasejour gymnasium also hosted the first round of the men's and women's FIVB World Volleyball Championships in 2008.

Other
Netball, rugby, swimming and basketball are rapidly becoming popular around the island. The Rodney Heights Aquatic Centre is a short-course (25m) swimming facility in the north of the island. St Lucia has also won multiple OECS Championships in swimming.

Squash is also relatively popular in St Lucia. The prime squash courts of St Lucia are found in the adjoining areas of St Lucia Racquet Club and St Lucia Yacht Club. St Lucia has hosted and won several iterations of the OECS Squash Tournament.

St Lucia was recently represented by a team of 48 who proceeded to Grenada on July 25, 2008 to participate in the Windward Islands Inter-School Championship Games. The tournament included Male and Female Volleyball, in which both the male and female teams were victorious, Male and Female Basketball, Netball, Football and Track and Field.

Stadiums in St. Lucia

References